Marebito ( or , まれびと) is an ancient Japanese word referring to a supernatural being who comes from afar bringing gifts of wisdom, spiritual knowledge and happiness. The word mare means "rare," while -bito (from the word hito) means both "person" and "spirit." The term refers to any one of a number of divine beings who were believed to visit villages in Japan, either from beyond the horizon or from beyond distant mountain ranges, bringing gifts. Villagers usually welcomed a marebito with rituals or festivals.
 
The 20th-century folklorist Shinobu Orikuchi, student of the great Japanese folklore scholar Kunio Yanagita, was the first to bring the ancient concept of marebito to the attention of modern scholars, and it has been widely assumed that the marebito tradition died out long ago. However, remnants can still be found in some areas of Japan, such as Akita Prefecture, where the Namahage tradition is maintained.

References

Shinto kami